Meegan is both a surname and a given name. Notable people with the name include:

Surname:
Dave Meegan, record producer 
George Meegan, British long-distance walker
Michael Elmore-Meegan, founder and international director of ICROSS
Paddy Meegan (1922–2012), Irish Gaelic footballer
Pete Meegan, American Major League Baseball player 

Given name:
Meegan Rooney, Australian netball player